The 2003 WNBA season was the seventh season for the Phoenix Mercury franchise. The season saw Phoenix going for the worst record in the league at a franchise worst of 8-26.

Offseason

Dispersal Draft

WNBA Draft

Regular season

Season standings

Season schedule

Player stats
Note: GP = Games played; REB = Rebounds; AST = Assists; STL = Steals; BLK = Blocks; PTS = Points; AVG = Average

References

Phoenix Mercury seasons
Phoenix
Phoenix Mercury